Magnesia Litera is an annual book award held in the Czech Republic since 2002. The prize covers all literary genres in eight genre categories: prose, poetry, children's book (since 2004), non-fiction, essay/journalism (since 2007), translation, publishing achievement, book debut, and the main prize – one of the genre nominee is named the "Czech Book of the Year".

The prize is awarded by an independent association Litera which associates members of all Czech literary or book-market organizations: Academy of Sciences of the Czech Republic, Association of Booksellers and Publishers, Czech Centre of International PEN, Czech section of IBBY, Society of Czech Writers, Czech Translators' Guild.

Books of the Year
 2022 – : Gott: Československý příběh (Gott: Czechoslovak Story) (non-fiction)
 2021 – Martin Hilský: Shakespearova Anglie (Shakespeare's England) (non-fiction)
 2020 – : Jan Žižka: Život a doba husitského válečníka (Jan Žižka: The Life and Times of a Hussite Warrior) (non-fiction)
 2019 – Radka Denemarková: Hodiny z olova
 2018 – Erik Tabery: Opuštěná společnost. Česká cesta od Masaryka po Babiše (Abandoned Society: The Czech Journey from Masaryk to Babiš) (non-fiction)
 2017 – Bianca Bellová: Jezero
 2016 – Daniela Hodrová: Točité věty
 2015 – : Básník. Román o Ivanu Blatném
 2014 – : Průvodce protektorátní Prahou (Guide to the Protectorate Prague) (non-fiction)
 2013 – Jiří Hájíček: Rybí krev (Fish Blood)
 2012 – Michal Ajvaz: Lucemburská zahrada (Luxembourg Garden)
 2011 – Jan Balabán: Zeptej se táty (Ask Dad)
 2010 – Petra Soukupová: Zmizet (To Disappear)
 2009 – Bohumila Grögerová: Rukopis (The Manuscript)
 2008 – : Záhádky
 2007 – : Simion Liftnicul (translated from Romanian by Jiří Našinec)
 2006 – : Bohemia
 2005 – Jan Novák: Zatím dobrý (So Far So Good)
 2004 – : Labyrintem revoluce (Through the Labyrinth of Velvet Revolution) (non-fiction)
 2003 – : Příběhy z dlouhého století – Architektura let 1750–1918 na Moravě a ve Slezsku (Stories from the Long Century: Moravian and Silesian Architecture 1790–1918) (non-fiction)
 2002 – : Böhmische Dörfer (publishing achievement by Triada Publishing)

See also
 List of Czech literary awards

External links
 www.magnesia-litera.cz

Czech literary awards
Awards established in 2002
2002 establishments in the Czech Republic